Kushk-e Fashapuyeh (also Romanized as Kūshk-e Fashāpūyeh; also known as Kūshk and Kūshkak) is a village in Koleyn Rural District, Fashapuyeh District, Ray County, Tehran Province, Iran. At the 2006 census, its population was 29, in 5 families.

References 

Populated places in Ray County, Iran